Bald Hill is an unincorporated community in Angelina County, in the U.S. state of Texas. According to the Handbook of Texas, the community had a population of 100 in 2000. It is located within the Lufkin, Texas micropolitan area.

History
The area in what is now known as Bald Hill today was settled sometime before 1900. It had three churches, several stores, and several houses in the 1930s. Many residents left the community after World War II, but it had three churches, a community center, and several scattered houses in the early 1990s. The community had a population of 100 in 2000.

Geography

Education
Bald Hill had its own school in the 1930s. Today, the community is served by the Lufkin Independent School District.

References

Unincorporated communities in Angelina County, Texas
Unincorporated communities in Texas